Ranjeeta "Robby" Kaur (born 22 September 1956) is an Indian actress.  She was trained at FTII. She has appeared in around 47 films. She has portrayed a variety of characters and her films include: Laila Majnu (1976), Ankhiyon Ke Jharokhon Se (1978) and Pati Patni Aur Woh (1978). She was nominated for the Filmfare Awards three times, including two of the above films.

Personal life
Kaur is married to Raj Masand and has a son named Sky. Ranjeeta lived in the past with her husband Raj and son Sky in Norfolk, Virginia, US. They moved to Koregaon Park, Pune a few years ago. They owned a series of 7-Eleven stores in Virginia.

Career
Kaur started her film career as the lead opposite Rishi Kapoor in the film Laila Majnu (1976). Subsequently, she acted in commercially successful films like Pati Patni Aur Woh (with Sanjeev Kumar) and Ankhiyon Ke Jharokhon Se (with Sachin).  She made a fabulous team with Mithun Chakravorty in films such as Surakshaa, Taraana, Humse Badhkar Kaun, Aadat Se Majboor, Baazi and Gunahon Ka Devta. She played Amitabh Bachchan's heroine in Satte Pe Satta. Her sister Rubina appeared in Ek Main aur Ek Tu opposite Rajeev Tandon (Raveena Tandon's brother). Kaur was associated with the Rajshri family having been in many of their successful films. She starred opposite Rishi Kapoor, Sachin, Raj Babbar, Raj Kiran, Deepak Parashar, Vinod Mehra and Amol Palekar in several films, and was paired with Mithun Chakraborty. Her last film before her exit from the film industry was Gunahon Ka Devta in 1990. She appeared in a few television serials in the mid 1990s and then took a hiatus from acting. After 15 years she returned to films in Anjaane: The Unknown (2005). In 2008 she starred in Zindagi Tere Naam which reunited her with Mithun Chakraborty. The film had a delayed release in 2012. In 2011 she reunited with Sachin in Jaana Pehchana, a sequel to Ankhiyon Ke Jharokhon Se.

Filmography

Awards and nominations

References

External links
 

1956 births
Living people
Film and Television Institute of India alumni
Actresses in Hindi cinema
Indian film actresses
20th-century Indian actresses
21st-century Indian actresses